Glen Urquhart School is an independent, coeducational day school for students in grades pre-K through grade eight, located in Beverly Farms, Massachusetts.

History 
Established in 1977 as North Shore Middle School, in a local church, Glen Urquhart School took residence on the former 23-acre Orchidvale Estate in Beverly Farms in 1982. The campus location is where Albert Burrage had raised thousands of varieties of orchids in 28 greenhouses.

When the school moved to the former Orchidvale property, it adopted its present name, Glen Urquhart School. The school combines the surname of Urquhart from the Urquhart Clan in Scotland, ancestors of the founders David and Lynne Warren, and "glen," the word for a green, shady place (replacing the word "vale" in the property's former name), creating the name Glen Urquhart.

The school's motto "Meane Weil. Speak Weil. Doe Weil." is taken from the Urquhart Clan in Scotland. "Trust and go forward" is the Urquhart clan battle cry. Both phrases appear in the GUS school song, written by Georgia Bills.

Today, Glen Urquhart School, known as "GUS," has approximately 200 students from 25 towns and cities on the North Shore of Boston. Curriculum and programming continues to be informed by a commitment to knowledge, creativity, and character.

Academics 
GUS offers an academic program beginning with pre-k through 8th grade. The school enrolls approximately 200 students across lower school (K-5) classrooms and upper school (6-8) grades. An experiential- and theme-based curriculum unfolds year by year, with kindergarten students studying "The World Around Us," then progressing through "Who Am I?' (First Grade), "Where Do I Live?" (Second Grade), "Where Am I Going?" (Third Grade), "The Sea" (Fourth Grade), "The Land" (Fifth Grade), "The People" (Sixth Grade) and returning to "Who Am I?" (Seventh Grade) and "Where Do I Live?  Where Am I Going?" (Eighth Grade). These themes are based in child development theory such as the work of Jean Piaget and John Dewey and are enhanced by Harvard's Project Zero, which all GUS teachers participate in as part of their professional development.

All students take a course of study including math, English/Language Arts, science, social studies, and Spanish.  Spanish culture and language instruction is offered in all grades, beginning in kindergarten. Service learning projects beginning in kindergarten and culminating in an eighth grade work week teach students about their community and global responsibilities. Partners include The Food Project and Beverly Bootstraps. An outdoor classroom, nature trail, and 7,000 square foot greenhouse provide settings for hands-on environmental and science study.

Arts and athletics 
From their earliest days at GUS, students take classes in the visual arts, in both vocal and instrumental music, in dance, and in drama.

In the lower grades, kindergarten through five, students take regular classes in art, music, and dance. In the sixth grade, dance evolves into drama, where their dance skills translate into choreography for their dramatic productions and musicals. By the time they are in eighth grade, the arts curriculum culminates in a student art show that includes oral presentations about their art, a dance recital involving individual and group choreography, and the performance of a Broadway musical involving all eighth grade students.

GUS students compete in soccer, cross-country, track and field, basketball, and lacrosse, acquiring the physical and mental foundation to become valuable players, captains, and All-Americans on high school and college teams.

Campus Resources 
The GUS campus includes seven buildings and spreads over 23 acres of woodland, marsh, and glen in the North Shore neighborhood of Beverly Farms.

References

External links 

Educational institutions established in 1977
Private elementary schools in Massachusetts
Schools in Beverly, Massachusetts
Private middle schools in Massachusetts
1977 establishments in Massachusetts